John N. Decore  (born Ivan Dikur; April 9, 1909 – November 11, 1994) was a barrister, lawyer, teacher, and politician from Alberta, Canada.

Nykola arrived in Canada in 1898 at the age of ten; Nykola was Hafia's second husband. Hafia died when John was only four years old he did not along with his stepmother.

He completed grade eleven before the Great Depression in Canada forced his father to stop supporting him financially. After attending the first eight grades at the local one-room school in Sniatyn, moved to Vegreville and boarded with a woman from his father home village, and later went to Eastwood School and Victoria School in Edmonton for grades 9 to 11, where he stayed in the bursa (dormitory) for Ukrainian students called the Hrushevsky Institute.  Students at the Institute took classes in Ukrainian language and culture in the evenings in addition to his studies in the regular English-language Albertan curriculum.  After completing grade eleven he went to the Edmonton Normal School in 1929-30 and then taught in a series of rural school in the region near Andrew.

He married Mysoslava Kupchenko in 1935 and also began attending the University of Alberta in a combined program that awarded him a B.A. in 1937 and an L.L.B. in 1938.  He articled in Vegreville and was called to the bar in 1939.  At university he played for the Golden Bears basketball team and was the national president of the Ukrainian Youth Association.

The couple lived in Vegreville where John practiced law during the Second World War as John was rejected by the Canadian Armed Forces due to arthritis.  John help to lead work bees and the fundraising efforts during for a public pool so the children of men serving overseas would have recreational activity, and was the president of the Kinsmen Club, the chamber of commerce, and the council of the local Ukrainian Orthodox Church, and school board trustee where he promoted the hiring of Ukrainian-Canadian teachers.

He anglicized his name to John by 1940s. He first ran for the House of Commons as a Liberal candidate in the 1949 federal election. He defeated Social Credit incumbent Anthony Hlynka in the riding of Vegreville.  He was re-elected in the 1953 election, once again defeating Hlynka.  He was appointed an advisor to Lester B. Pearson during Pearson's time as Ambassador of Canada to the United Nations and gave several speeches in the United States including representing Canada at U.N. Headquarters (then at Lake Success, New York) and speaking on Ukrainian issues at Carnegie Hall with U.S. Senator Lehman.  In Parliament he was a vocal anti-communist and an activist for Ukrainian rights in both Canada and the Soviet Union.  At his urging Canadian immigration documents began to recognize "Ukrainian" as nationality, and not merely the name of regional population within the Soviet Union.  He also advocated for allowing the members of the controversial 14th Waffen Grenadier Division of the SS (1st Galician) to immigrate to Canada.  He considered his "crowning achievement" in politics to be arranging for Prime Minister Louis St. Laurent to open the Ukrainian Pioneer Home monument at Elk Island National Park in 1951.  He also arranged for a concert of the Ukrainian Bandurist Chorus in the Railway Committee Room of Parliament and the creation of a Ukrainian-language service at Voice of Canada.  He retired from Parliament in 1957.  Decore attempted to return to federal politics in the 1962 election, this time in the Edmonton East electoral district, but he lost to Progressive Conservative (PC) incumbent William Skoreyko. He ran once more in the 1963 federal election in Edmonton—Strathcona, losing to PC incumbent Terry Nugent.

Was was made a Q.C. in 1964 and in 1965 was appointed Chief Justice of the District Court of Northern Alberta and supervised its merger with the southern district court.  He was also involved in the creation of the Court of Queen's Bench for Alberta in 1979.  He retired as chief justice in that year and was awarded an honourary degree of Doctor of Laws in 1980.

Decore's son Laurence was mayor of Edmonton and leader of the Opposition in the Legislative Assembly of Alberta.

References

External links 

1909 births
1994 deaths
Members of the House of Commons of Canada from Alberta
Liberal Party of Canada MPs
Canadian people of Ukrainian descent
20th-century Canadian judges
20th-century Eastern Orthodox Christians
Members of Ukrainian Orthodox church bodies
University of Alberta Faculty of Law alumni
People from Lamont County
Canadian schoolteachers
Canadian anti-communists
Multiculturalism activists in Canada
Eastern Orthodox Christians from Canada